is a Japanese virtual board game for the Nintendo 64. It was released only in Japan in 1998.

It is the indirect sequel to Saikyō Habu Shōgi, a launch game for the Nintendo 64.

It has a built-in RJ-11 Modem Connection port with which players were able to connect to (now defunct) servers to play against other players all around Japan. The game can be exploited for arbitrary code execution, allowing owners to run their own homebrew software.

See also
 Shogi
 List of Nintendo 64 games

References

External links
CVE-2020-13109 at the National Vulnerability Database

1998 video games
Cancelled 64DD games
Japan-exclusive video games
Nintendo 64 games
Nintendo 64-only games
Shogi video games
Video games developed in Japan